Stellaria humifusa, the saltmarsh starwort, is plant native to northern North America and Eurasia.

References

holostea
Flora of Eastern Canada
Flora of Eastern Europe
Flora of Northern Europe
Flora of Siberia
Flora of Subarctic America
Flora of the Northeastern United States
Flora of the Russian Far East
Flora of Western Canada
Flora without expected TNC conservation status